A Jyotirlinga or Jyotirlingam, is a devotional representation of the Hindu god Shiva. The Śiva Mahāpurāṇam (also Shiva Purana) mentions 64 original jyotirlinga shrines in [[India]

Hinduism

Legend 

According to a Shaiva legend from the Shiva Purana, once, Brahma (the god of creation) and Vishnu (the god of preservation) had an argument over their supremacy. To settle the debate, Shiva pierced the three worlds, appearing as a huge, infinite pillar of light, the jyotirlinga. Brahma and Vishnu decided to ascend and descend across the pillar of light respectively, to find the end of the light in either direction. According to some iterations, Vishnu assumed his Varaha avatar to achieve this task, while Brahma rode a hamsa (swan). Brahma lied that he had discovered the end of the light, producing a ketakī flower as proof, while Vishnu admitted that he could not find the end of the light from his journey. The dishonesty of Brahma angered Shiva, causing him to curse the creator deity that he would not be worshipped; he also declared that Vishnu would be eternally worshipped for his honesty. The jyotirlinga shrines are regarded to be the temples where Shiva appeared as a fiery column of light.

Original 64 

Originally, there were believed to have been 64 jyotirlings of which twelve are considered to be very auspicious and holy. The twelve jyotirlinga sites take
the names of their respective presiding deity, and each is considered a different manifestation of Shiva. At all these sites, the primary image is lingam, representing the beginningless and endless stambha pillar, symbolising the infinite nature of Shiva.

Sanskrit shlokas

The following shloka (द्वादश ज्योतिर्लिंग स्तोत्रम् Dvādaśa Jyotirliṅga Stotram) describes the 12 jyotirlingas:

Twelve most sacred sites 

The names and the locations of 12 jyotirlingas are mentioned in the Shiva Purana (Ch.42/2-4). The detailed stories are given in Kotirudra Saṁhitā, chapters 14 to 33. These temples (not in order) are:

See also

References

Citations

Works cited

External links
Jyotirlingas on Google Maps
Jyotirlingas in India

 

 
Forms of Shiva